Gökhan Tiryaki (born 1972) is a Turkish cinematographer. He contributed to more than twenty films, including Once Upon a Time in Anatolia and Winter Sleep.

References

External links 

1972 births
Living people
Turkish cinematographers